The Palace of Firebirds is a 2016 book, by Tymo Lin (Chinese: 提子墨), This is a mystery and love story spanning half a century.  From the modern computer age back to those years when thousands upon thousands of US Armed Forces from the Vietnam War were taking R&R in Taiwan.

Four individuals from the younger generation: a one-time IT management director now a telemarketer; a home-geek romance novelist; a former female super star; a scammer with a soft heart and a villain’s face join forces in an odyssey across Taiwan.

Their lives have intersected with an advanced cancer patient "Ms. Hu" - known as "Christina", one of the first Jazz singers in Taipei’s American club back in 1966.

In search of the American Sergeant, "Ryan Jenkins", from San Francisco who disappeared and a long-lost mixed little boy, Oliver Hu-Jenkins, they started an "Oliver Mission" journey on a scrapped blood donation bus named "Phoenix".

From north to south, from beautiful cities and counties to an aboriginal tribal village... they travel through Taiwan searching for the missing boy, Oliver, and a secret promised land, "The Palace of Firebirds".

On the journey, they use modern computing, networking, hacking, and cyber man hunting technologies to look for the boy who disappeared without a trace.

In the meantime each of them found an important missing piece in their own lives and a meaningful lesson for their future...

This novel is currently in circulation at the "San Francisco Public Library" in the states.

References

Taiwanese mystery novels
Taiwanese romance novels
2016 Taiwanese novels